Bakersfield Christian High School (BCHS) is a private, college-preparatory, nondenominational Christian school. It is fully accredited by the Western Association of Schools and Colleges and the Association of Christian Schools International.

History
In 1979, Omega High School was founded and run by a local church, teaching students from kindergarten to 12th grade. In 1986, the church and Omega High separated, leaving the school to operate independently, after which it became Community Christian High School. Ten years later, the school renamed itself Bakersfield Christian High School to reflect its status as the only nondenominational Christian high school in Bakersfield.

Campus
BCHS is located on a 46-acre campus on the corner of Stockdale Highway and Allen Road,
in the growing west side of Bakersfield. The facilities feature highlights such as the Media Center, Student Union, Fine Arts Center and a Sports Center which houses one of the largest high school gymnasiums in Kern County.

Administration
 Matt Guinn, President
 Nate Thiessen, Vice President of Advancement
 Steven Chai, Vice President of Academic Growth
 Rachel Welch, Vice President of Student Life
 Jeff Ward, Vice President of Athletics

Academics
BCHS offers two paths to a diploma: college preparatory and the scholars program.

College preparatory diploma
241 credits are required for graduation. Each class earns 5 credits each semester. Community service earns 1 credit for 40 or more hours of service.

Scholars program diploma
Full-time, on campus students, who attend for 4 years, qualify for the Scholars Program by completing a required minimum of 6 advanced courses (effective class of 2012): 2 from the sophomore year and 4 from the junior/senior years.

Advanced Placement
The school offers AP courses which cover the breadth of information, skills and assignments found in corresponding college courses. Each AP course has an exam that participating schools administer in May and represents the culmination of college-level work in a given discipline in a secondary school setting.

Athletics
The Eagles participate in the South Yosemite League and CIF Central Section and have varsity, JV and frosh/soph teams.

2013–14
The Eagles won nine league titles, six section championships (boys’ tennis, football, girls’ golf, girls’ soccer, girls’ tennis, volleyball) and sent three teams to the state playoffs in their respective sports. 

The football team was named Southern California Champions and was runner-up in the final state championship game.  The volleyball team advanced to the quarter final match of the state championship run and the girls soccer team lost in the semi-final round of the Southern California Championships.

2006 volleyball state champions
In 2006, the BCHS women's varsity volleyball team won the Division V state championship against the Castilleja High School Gators. It was the first state championship of any kind for BCHS.

Back-to-back division V football champions
In 2007, the BCHS varsity football team won the CIF Central Section Division V title against the previously undefeated Fowler High School Redcats in Fowler, CA. They won in overtime, 35–34. The following year they won the CIF Central Section Division V football championship as the number two seed, this time beating the previously undefeated Corcoran High School Panthers 49–27 in Corcoran, CA.

Notable alumni
 Derek Carr  - NFL Quarterback

References

External links
 School website

Christian schools in California
Educational institutions established in 1979
Private high schools in California
1979 establishments in California